Risin' with the Blues is the last studio album released by American musician Ike Turner. The album was released in the United States on September 12, 2006. It was produced by Turner's son, Ike Turner Jr., and Roger Nemour. The album was well received, receiving positive reviews, and winning the Grammy Award for Best Traditional Blues Album.

Critical reception 

Senior contributor of All About Jazz, C. Michael Bailey, rated the album five stars and wrote:There is nothing remotely retro about the music or its production. Turner seamlessly updates the music with which he has been associated for fifty years, advancing the causes of Robert Cray, Little Milton, Otis Rush and Buddy Guy with burping electric bass, sinewy lead guitars and horns aplenty.

Reviewing the album for AllMusic, Jonathan Widran wrote:The real joys of this disc are his scorching guitar energy, followed by his jumpy boogie-woogie piano. It's pretty much a funky and humor-laden bluesfest throughout, from his funked-up update of "Gimme Back My Wig" to the shuffling blues of "Tease Me." He finds a balance between tongue in cheek attitudes (as on the retitling of "Five Long Years" to "Eighteen Long Years," a reference to his marriage to Tina) with more heartfelt touches on softer songs like "A Love Like Yours." He also ventures into spirited New Orleans territory on "Goin' Home Tomorrow" and offers a prayer of forgiveness for his countless lifelong sins by declaring that "Jesus Loves Me."

Awards and nominations 
Risin' with the Blues won Turner his first solo Grammy for Best Traditional Blues Album at the 49th Annual Grammy Awards. The album earned Turner a nomination for best Blues Album at the 7th Annual Independent Music Awards.

Personnel 

Ike Turner: lead vocals, guitar, piano

Audrey Madison: background vocals on track 7

The Kings of Rhythm:

 Mack Johnson, Leo Dombecki, Ryan Montana – horns
 Seth Blumberg, Joe Kelly – guitars
 Kenny Frizelle – harp
 Lenny "Fuzzy" Rankins – guitar on track 5
 Paul Smith, Ernest Lane – keyboards
 Kenny Cooper – bass
 Bill Ray, Matt Long, Harry Jen Frizelle – drums

Track listing

References 

2006 albums
Ike Turner albums
Grammy Award for Best Traditional Blues Album